Susan Lea Page (born February 12, 1951) is an American journalist and biographer, and the Washington DC Bureau Chief for USA Today newspaper.

Early life 
Page, a native of Wichita, Kansas, is a 1973 graduate of Northwestern University's Medill School of Journalism, where she was editor-in-chief of the Daily Northwestern, and has a master's degree from Columbia University Graduate School of Journalism, where she was a Pulitzer Fellow.

As a child, Page had two passions: music and journalism. She began studying oboe in the third grade and played it in the school orchestras throughout her public school education. She was also the editor-in-chief of her high school yearbook, The Hoofbeats, and served as a reporter and editor for her high school newspaper, The Stampede. She considered attending music school, but ultimately decided to pursue journalism at Northwestern University.

Career
Page has covered seven White House administrations and eleven presidential elections, and interviewed ten presidents. She founded and hosts an award-winning video newsmaker series for USA Today, "Capital Download" . She appears frequently on cable news networks as an analyst and often guest-hosted The Diane Rehm Show, which was syndicated on National Public Radio. She was the first woman to serve as music chairman of the Gridiron Club show and was also president of the club in 2011, the oldest association of journalists in Washington. She was president of the White House Correspondents Association in 2000. She also served as chairman of the Robert F. Kennedy Journalism Awards and has twice been a juror for the Pulitzer Prizes.
 
Her first book was published in 2019, a biography of former First Lady Barbara Bush titled The Matriarch: Barbara Bush and the Making of an American Dynasty. In 2021, her biography of House Speaker Nancy Pelosi was published, titled Madam Speaker: Nancy Pelosi and the Lessons of Power. Page signed a deal with Simon & Schuster in 2021 to write a biography of legendary broadcaster Barbara Walters. Page was selected as the moderator of the 2020 vice presidential debate between Mike Pence and Kamala Harris, which took place on October 7, 2020 in Salt Lake City.

Page attracted scrutiny over her journalistic ethics when investigations revealed she had hosted off-the-record events for Trump administration officials like CMS Administrator Seema Verma. USA Today defended her participation, claiming she put on the soirees for female officials of both parties.

She is a frequent panelist on Fox News Sunday, This Week on ABC, Washington Week on PBS, and Meet the Press on NBC.

Awards 
She has won several awards for her work, including the Merriman Smith Memorial Award, the Aldo Beckman Memorial Award, the Gerald R. Ford Prize for Distinguished Reporting on the Presidency (twice) and the Sigma Delta Chi Distinguished Service Award for Washington Correspondence (shared).

Personal life
In 1982, she married Carl Leubsdorf, syndicated columnist and former Washington bureau chief for The Dallas Morning News, in a non-denominational ceremony in Washington, D.C.

Bibliography
 The Matriarch: Barbara Bush and the Making of an American Dynasty (Twelve, 2019) 
 Madam Speaker: Nancy Pelosi and the Lessons of Power (Twelve, 2021)

References

External links
https://susanpagedc.com/
Her bio from usatoday.com
Interview with Susan Page in the recruiting section of usatoday.com (2004)

1951 births
Living people
20th-century American journalists
21st-century American biographers
21st-century American journalists
American women journalists
Columbia University Graduate School of Journalism alumni
Journalists from Kansas
Medill School of Journalism alumni
USA Today journalists
Writers from Wichita, Kansas
20th-century American women
21st-century American women